Lost in the Game is a 2005 American drama film written and directed by MC Ren.  The film stars MC Ren, Playboy T and Nitetrain. The film was released January 25, 2005.

Synopsis 
Navigating the sketchy terrain of record companies and street hustlers, Playboy T. undertakes to promote his protégé and cash in on him in the process. When the rich but extremely dangerous gangster The Vill (MC Ren) gets out of jail, Playboy T. puts it all on the line and asks him for help in making the Nitetrain record.

References

2005 films
African-American drama films
Films set in 2005
Films set in California
Films set in Los Angeles
American gangster films
2000s hip hop films
Hood films
2005 drama films
2005 directorial debut films
2000s English-language films
2000s American films